Henrik Andersson is a Swedish sprint canoer who competed in the late 1990s. He won two bronze medals at the 1997 ICF Canoe Sprint World Championships in Dartmouth, earning them in the K-2 200 m and K-4 500 m events.

References

Living people
Swedish male canoeists
Year of birth missing (living people)
ICF Canoe Sprint World Championships medalists in kayak